John Sidney Garrett (October 29, 1921 – May 28, 2005) was an American politician who served in the Louisiana House of Representatives from 1948 to 1972 as a Democrat, and as speaker from 1968 to 1972.

References

 John S. Garrett obituary, the Shreveport Times, May 29, 2005.
 https://web.archive.org/web/20061123032129/http://politicsla.com/archives/2005/may.shtml
 Members of the Louisiana Legislature, 1880-2004 (Baton Rouge: Secretary of State)
 https://web.archive.org/web/20070927185331/http://www.latech.edu/specialcollections/collections/m134.shtml

1921 births
2005 deaths
Speakers of the Louisiana House of Representatives
Democratic Party members of the Louisiana House of Representatives
Louisiana Tech University alumni
People from Haynesville, Louisiana
Businesspeople from Louisiana
American bankers
United States Army personnel of World War II
United States Army officers
Citizens' Councils
20th-century American politicians
Burials in Louisiana
American United Methodists
20th-century Methodists
21st-century Methodists